The UEFA European Women's Championship, also called the UEFA Women's Euro, held every four years, is the main competition in women's association football between national teams of the UEFA confederation. The competition is the women's equivalent of the UEFA European Championship.

This article lists the goal scorers at the UEFA European Women's Championship.

Overall top goalscorers

All-time top scorers

Top scorers by tournament

Goalscorers by countries 
Numbers in green means the player finished as the tournament top scorer (or joint top scorer). Years outlined in red indicate host nation status.







Own goals scored for opponents

 Louisa Waller (scored for Germany in 1995)
 Millie Bright (scored for the Netherlands in 2017)

Own goals scored for opponents

 Sanna Valkonen (scored for England in 2005)

Own goals scored for opponents

 Cécile Locatelli (scored for Sweden in 1997)
 Emmanuelle Sykora (scored for Norway in 2001)

 Own goals scored for opponents

 Merle Frohms (scored for France in 2022)



Own goals scored for opponents

 Rafaella Manieri (scored for Sweden in 2013)



Own goals scored for opponents

 Kelsie Burrows (scored for England in 2022)



Own goals scored for opponents

 Carole Costa (scored for Sweden in 2022)





Own goals scored for opponents

 Irene Paredes (scored for Norway in 2013)

Own goals scored for opponents

 Stina Segerström (scored for Norway in 2009)

Own goals scored for opponents

 Ana-Maria Crnogorčević (scored for the Netherlands in 2022)



See also

References

goalscorers
International women's association football competition records and statistics
UEFA Women's Championship scorers